"I Hate Myself for Loving You" is a song by American rock band Joan Jett and the Blackhearts, released as the lead single from their sixth studio album, Up Your Alley (1988). The song reached number eight on the US Billboard Hot 100, Jett's third and last single to reach the top 10, and was her first since "Crimson and Clover" in 1982. The song spent six weeks longer on the charts than did the group's biggest hit, "I Love Rock 'n' Roll" (which was on the chart for 20 weeks). On September 10, 2011, the single reached number 39 on the US Rock Digital Songs chart.

Former Rolling Stones guitarist Mick Taylor played the guitar solo in the song. One of the backing vocalists featured on the Up Your Alley album was Louie Merlino, later the founder of the band Beggars & Thieves.

Cash Box called it "s a mean, growling performance from the high-flying Jett" in which "over a craggy landscape of heavy guitars she exudes a sexual anger and power."

The song received a nomination for Best Rock Performance by a Duo or Group with Vocal at the 31st Grammy Awards.

A cover of The Troggs' song "I Can't Control Myself" was featured as a B-side on the CD single, a non-album track.

The song was adapted for NBC Sunday Night Football, named "Waiting All Day for Sunday Night" with Carrie Underwood (previously Pink and Faith Hill) on vocal and Joan Jett on guitar.

The song was used in the opening scene of Harley Quinn moving on after her breakup with the Joker in Birds of Prey and for the Season 5 trailer for Big Mouth.

Taiwanese amateur composer Pei-Li Sun had extracted the chorus of this song for his solo work for Zhongruan named Zhongruan Rock, written in 1993 and revised on 2008.

Personnel 
Joan Jett and the Blackhearts
 Joan Jett – lead vocals, rhythm guitar
 Ricky Byrd – lead guitar, backing vocals
 Kasim Sulton – bass, backing vocals
 Thommy Price – drums

Additional musicians
 Ronnie Lawson – keyboards
 Mick Taylor – guitar solo
 Desmond Child – production

Charts

Weekly charts

Year-end charts

References

1988 singles
1988 songs
National Football League
 
Joan Jett songs
Sunday Night Football
Song recordings produced by Desmond Child
Songs written by Desmond Child
Songs written by Joan Jett